Leo Vasseur is a politician from Alberta, Canada. He was elected in the 1993 Alberta general election defeating Ernie Isley of the Progressive Conservatives.

He was defeated by Denis Ducharme from the Progressive Conservatives during the 1997 Alberta general election after his district was abolished and he ran in the new Bonnyville-Cold Lake riding. He only served one term in the Legislative Assembly of Alberta.

Vasseur currently serves as regional chair for the northwest region on the Alberta Liberal Party executive.

Election results

|}

References

External links
Liberal Party executive

Alberta Liberal Party MLAs
Living people
Franco-Albertan people
1946 births